The 78th Assembly District of Wisconsin is one of 99 districts in the Wisconsin State Assembly.  Located in south-central Wisconsin, the district comprises the west side of the city of Madison in central Dane County.  The district is represented by Democrat Lisa Subeck, since January 2015.

The 78th Assembly District is located within Wisconsin's 26th Senate district, along with the 76th and 77th Assembly districts.

History

Notable former representatives of this district include Tammy Baldwin, who was later elected to the United States House of Representatives and is now a United States Senator, and Mark Pocan, who is the current congressman for Wisconsin's 2nd congressional district.

List of past representatives

References 

Wisconsin State Assembly districts
Dane County, Wisconsin